The Genesis GV80 is a mid-size luxury crossover SUV manufactured and marketed by Genesis, Hyundai's luxury division.

Overview

Internally codenamed JX1, the vehicle was leaked in 3D in October 2019 and officially unveiled in January 2020 as the first SUV for the Genesis brand. It is a collaborative effort between Genesis design teams in Korea, Europe, and the United States. Built on a new rear-wheel-drive architecture, the doors, hood, and tailgate are made aluminum.

It features a navigation-based smart cruise control (ASCC), remote smart parking assist, an NFC digital key, an around view monitor (AVM), 22-inch wheels, Nappa leather seating, a 14.5-inch touchscreen infotainment display with the 21-speakers Lexicon audio system, electric side curtains, and driver-controlled second and third row seating.

The safety system includes ten airbags, forward collision-avoidance assist, reverse parking collision-avoidance assist, driver attention warning, blind-spot collision-avoidance assist, automatic high beam assist, and lane keep assist (LKAS).

Claimed  emissions range from  (2.5L petrol), from  (3.5L petrol) and from  (3.0L diesel).

GV80 Concept
The GV80 was previewed by a concept of the same name, equipped with an electric powertrain and hydrogen fuel cell, which debuted at the New York International Auto Show in 2017. The GV80 Concept was styled by Luc Donckerwolke as his first project for the marque after he had moved from Bentley. Hyundai suspended development of hydrogen cars in 2021.

Markets

South Korea 
On August 30, 2021, the GV80 was officially released with a change in the model year. The 2022 GV80 added a six-seater model with independent seats in the second row from the existing 5/7 seat model. In addition, it expanded the front-wheel monoblock brake caliper to the gasoline 2.5 turbo model and 3.0 diesel model. It also added a copper colour to the caliper of the gasoline 3.5 turbo model.

Mauna Red and Barossa Burgundy (glossy/matte) were added to the exterior, while Urban Brown and Vanilla Beige two-tone colours were added to the standard design model.

United States 
In the United States, it was launched in November 2020 for the 2021 model year. It is available in rear-wheel-drive, for the Standard, Advanced and Prestige trim levels and powered by the 2.5-liter turbocharged engine. All-wheel-drive is also offered with the 3.5-liter V6 twin-turbo for the AWD Standard, AWD Advanced, AWD Advanced+ and AWD Prestige trim levels available.

Powertrain

Recall 
In June 2020, Hyundai Motor suspended delivery of the diesel powered GV80, as the company determined there were engine vibration issues due to carbon buildup. In September 2020, Hyundai Motor recalled 8,783 GV80s because of engine stall. Since the vehicle was launched in January, there have been eight recalls, four of which involved the engine.

Sales

References

External links

 
 

GV80
Cars introduced in 2020
Mid-size sport utility vehicles
Luxury crossover sport utility vehicles
Rear-wheel-drive vehicles
All-wheel-drive vehicles